Marcel Puget (18 September 1940 – 1 July 2021) was a French rugby union player who played for the national team. Puget played 17 tests for France, including four Five Nations games.

References

1940 births
2021 deaths
People from Limoux
French rugby union players
CA Brive players
France international rugby union players
Sportspeople from Aude